Navanax is a genus of sea slugs, marine opisthobranch gastropod mollusks in the family Aglajidae.

Species
Species in the genus Navanax include:
 Navanax aenigmaticus (Bergh, 1893)  - mysterious aglaja
 Navanax gemmatus (Mörch, 1863)
 Navanax inermis (J. G. Cooper, 1863) - California aglaja
 Navanax orbignyanus (Rochebrune, 1881)
 Navanax polyalphos (Gosliner & Williams, 1972)

References

 Rolán E., 2005. Malacological Fauna From The Cape Verde Archipelago. Part 1, Polyplacophora and Gastropoda.

Aglajidae